Other Lewis Windsor, 4th Earl of Plymouth (12 May 1731 – 21 April 1771) was a British peer, styled Lord Windsor until 1732.

At the age of one, he succeeded his father Other Windsor, 3rd Earl of Plymouth, as Earl of Plymouth. In 1736, his maternal grandfather, Thomas Lewis, died, after naming Plymouth as the heir to his estates. 

Plymouth was educated at Eton and Queen's College, Oxford, graduating BA.

In March 1750, Plymouth was appointed Constable of Flint Castle, Comptroller of the records in the counties of Chester and Flint, and Comptroller of the Pleas, Fine and Amerciaments in county Caernarvon. His degree was promoted to MA by seniority in July.

In 1753, Plymouth was appointed Custos Rotulorum of Flintshire, and in 1754 as  Lord Lieutenant of Glamorgan. He was also made a deputy lieutenant of Worcestershire in 1757. He married Catherine, eldest daughter of Thomas Archer, 1st Baron Archer, on 11 August 1750.

When he died in 1771, Plymouth was succeeded by his son Other Windsor, 5th Earl of Plymouth.

References

Alumni of The Queen's College, Oxford
4
Lord-Lieutenants of Glamorgan
People educated at Eton College
1731 births
1771 deaths